Misra Records is an independent record label based in Pittsburgh, Pennsylvania. The label is distributed by Redeye Worldwide.

Founded in 1999, Misra Records is home to landmark releases by Destroyer, Phosphorescent, Shearwater, R. Ring (featuring Kelley Deal of The Breeders), Holopaw, Centro-matic, Jenny Toomey, Palomar (band), Great Lake Swimmers, Sleeping States, Southeast Engine, Crooks on Tape (featuring John Schmersal of Brainiac/Enon), Motel Beds and many more.

History
Michael Bracy, activist and co-founder of Future of Music Coalition, launched the label, along with brother Timothy Bracy, writer and front-man of The Mendoza Line, and D.C.-based attorney and artist advocate Paige Conner Totaro. Current Dead Oceans manager Phil Waldorf sat at the helm of Misra from its founding until late 2006. Cory Brown, owner of Absolutely Kosher, oversaw operations from 2007 to 2010. Leo DeLuca, of the band Southeast Engine, managed the label from 2010 to 2015. Jeff Betten, former manager of Wild Kindness Records, is the current manager of Misra.

Artists

 André Costello
 Bablicon
 Bears
 The Black Swans
 The Bruces
 Centro-Matic
 Crooks on Tape (featuring John Schmersal of Brainiac/Enon)
 Destroyer
 Evangelicals
 Flotation Toy Warning
 Great Lake Swimmers
 Hallelujah the Hills
 Holopaw
 Mars Jackson
 Will Johnson
 The Low Lows
 Marshmallow Coast
 William Matheny
 The Mendoza Line
 Mobius Band
 Modern Howls
 Motel Beds
 Palomar
 Paperhaus
 The Paranoid Style
 Phosphorescent
 Emily Rodgers
 R. Ring (Kelley Deal & Mike Montgomery)
 Shearwater
 Sleeping States (Markland Starkie)
 Slow Dazzle
 South San Gabriel
 Southeast Engine
 St. Thomas
 Summer Hymns
 Anthonie Tonnon
 Jenny Toomey
 Torres
 Adam Torres
 Volcano the Bear
 Water Liars
 Wooden Wand

See also
 List of record labels

References

External links
Official website
Redeye Worldwide
Sub Pop Licensing
Interview with Misra co-owner Michael Bracy of The Future of Music Coalition

American record labels
Record labels established in 1999
Indie rock record labels
1999 establishments in Pennsylvania